Flamenco Road is an album by Michael Laucke, released on September 12, 2001. The album consists mainly of his own compositions in the new flamenco style, which he also arranged. In an interview for Voir magazine, Laucke stated: "It is also very influenced by my classical background. So it's a smoother flamenco." An example of this style from the album can be heard in Laucke's treatment of the well-known classical guitar transcription "Leyenda", which is given a flamenco rendition using several percussion instruments (claves, maracas, special castanets mounted on wood blocks, chimes, and a large gong), bass, and flute.

Ten works were recorded at five different studios, each selected for its specific acoustics, in Montreal, Canada. The instrumentation for the recording's title piece, "Flamenco Road", required the use of a 24-track recording system; a Voir magazine article declared it to be the first recording in this style to employ 24 tracks. The instrumentation comprises a combination of four types of guitars—flamenco, Spanish, classical, and electric—and all natural acoustic guitars are played the Spanish way, using all the fingers of the right hand without a pick. The rhythm section includes "bongos, four congas, and a rock drum set blended with other percussion instruments such as claves, maracas, and castanets". It further incorporates "three dancers performing typical 'palmas' (hand-clapping) in synchronization", as well as three trumpets, three pianos, and a "country-style" violinist.

The enhanced CD includes two videos: one with interactive live concert footage filmed during Laucke's tenth season at Montreal's Place des Arts, and the other with the video clip of "Flamenco Road". The latter reached number one on video charts across Canada for five consecutive weeks. The Journal-Pioneer opined "Flamenco Road is an absolute joy to behold".

Track listing

Musicians 

 Michael Laucke – Spanish and classical guitars (solo, rhythm and fill tracks)
 Marie-Josée Guilbeault – violinist
 Oscar Martinez – Trumpets
 Paul Pivetta – electric guitar
 Réggie Larko – Falseta vocals and keyboards
 Rob Roy – Bass Guitar
 Robert Dethiers – Percussionist

Production credits

Enhanced CD (multimedia) portion

Media

Audio

Video

References 

Articles containing video clips
2001 classical albums
Media containing Gymnopedies
New flamenco